Liu Xiaoyu is the name of:

 Liu Xiaoyu (basketball) (born 1989), Chinese professional basketball player
 Liu Xiaoyu (swimmer) (born 1988), Chinese international swimmer
 Bruce Liu (pianist) (born 1997), Canadian pianist